The Austin Dam, also known as the Bayless Dam, was a concrete gravity dam in the Austin, Pennsylvania, area that served the Bayless Pulp and Paper Mill.  Built in 1909, it was the largest dam of its type in Pennsylvania at the time.  The catastrophic failure of the dam on September 30, 1911, caused significant destruction and loss of life in Freeman Run Valley below the dam.

History
In 1900, George Bayless, owner of Bayless Paper, built a paper mill in the Freeman Run Valley. By 1909, the company realized that occasional dry seasons required a more reliable water source. After finding a small earthen dam to be inadequate, the T. Chalkey Hatton firm was commissioned to build a large concrete gravity dam across the valley. It was designed to be 30 feet thick, but was built only 20 feet thick. Because it was deemed too expensive, an underground vertical concrete slab, which had been designed to prevent water seeping under the dam through the soil on which the dam sat, was not built, on Bayless's orders. At the time, Pennsylvania had no state regulations or requirements about the building of dams.

The inhabitants of the town of Austin, Pennsylvania, downstream from the dam, referred to it, with Bayless's encouragement, as "The dam that could not break."

Within only a few months of its completion, problems were detected. Water was seeping under the dam, which also bowed more than  under the pressure of the water it was holding, and the concrete started cracking. The bowing was alleviated by using dynamite to blast a  space for the excess water to spill over. The cracking was claimed to be normal because of the drying concrete.

On September 30, 1911, a holiday, after a week of rainstorms that raised the level of the reservoir to only 2 feet below the overflow level, the dam failed. The wall of water destroyed the paper mill and much of the town of Austin, which was so deeply covered by water in places that only church steeples could be seen. Due to the slope of the valley, the east side of the town received more damage.  

Around 3,000 people were in Austin that day, and the catastrophic failure of the dam resulted in the deaths of 78 of them, and roughly $10 million in property damage. The madam of the town's brothel, which was located upstream of the town, saw the failure coming and warned the town, saving many lives.
The paper mill and dam were subsequently rebuilt, but the mill was lost in a fire in 1933.  A new dam was built, but it also failed, in 1942, with no loss of life.  The dam was not replaced after the second failure.

Legacy
The victims of the dam break are commemorated in the Austin Dam Memorial Park.

The remains of the failed first dam still stand. The ruins consist of a series of broken sections extending east-west across the Freeman Run Valley - five upright sections and two large and several smaller toppled sections.  The site was added to the National Register of Historic Places in 1987.

In popular culture
A documentary about the dam disaster, featuring narration by Willie Nelson, was created by Mansfield University of Pennsylvania professor Gale Largey in 1999.  It includes interviews with five survivors along with original newsreel footage.

References

External links

 Austin (Bayless) Dam failure case study at the Association of State Dam Safety Officials

Dams in Pennsylvania
Dam failures in the United States
Disasters in Pennsylvania
Buildings and structures in Potter County, Pennsylvania
Dams completed in 1909
Dams on the National Register of Historic Places in Pennsylvania
1909 establishments in Pennsylvania
National Register of Historic Places in Potter County, Pennsylvania